Corazón salvaje is a 1956 Mexican drama film directed by Juan José Ortega and starring Martha Roth, Christiane Martel, Carlos Navarro and Rafael Bertrand. It was the first screen adaptation of the novel of the same name written by Caridad Bravo Adams and published in 1957, a year after the film adaptation was released. The first adaptation was made as a radionovela.

Cast
 Martha Roth as Mónica Molnar
 Christiane Martel as Aimée Molnar
 Carlos Navarro as Juan del Diablo
 Rafael Bertrand as Renato Duchamp
 Dalia Íñiguez
 Julio Villarreal
 Fedora Capdevila
 Víctor Alcocer
 Armando Velasco

External links 
 

1956 films
1950s Spanish-language films
Films based on Mexican novels
Films set in the 1900s
Films directed by Juan José Ortega
Estudios Churubusco films
1956 drama films
Mexican drama films
1950s Mexican films
Mexican black-and-white films